"Go Bang" is a song by Pnau, released in October 2017 as the second single from the band's fifth studio album, Changa (2017). The song features vocals from Kira Divine.

Digital remixes were released on 8 December 2017.

At the ARIA Music Awards of 2018, the song was nominated for five awards, winning Best Dance Release.

At the APRA Music Awards of 2019, the song was nominated for Dance Work of the Year and Most Played Australian Work.

Reception
Hayden Davis from Pile Rats said: "with the mixture of Divine's uplifting vocals with the addictive house charm of Pnau proving itself to be a winning combo once again. It's light and refreshing – perfect for chill, at-home listening – but the catchiness of Pnau's bass-driven beat also makes it an A+ club thumper which will no doubt dominate as we hit the warmer months much like "Chameleon" did last year."

Music video 
The music was produced and directed by "Toby & Pete". They state "We wanted to take the viewer on a journey through the desert, meet the Fire Goddess KIRA and be hit with complete hyper-real psychedelia".

The video uses extensive CGI and special effects. As the video starts, the camera zooms onto a female figure. The figure is charcoal black with parts of her skin glowing like lips and orange glowing hair. She is standing in the middle of a field of presumably, extra-terrestrial plants. As the video goes on, the plants begin to pulsate their light in accordance with the beat. More of the female figures appear and dance to the rhythm of the song. As the video goes on, a panoramic shattered glass appears showing women posing with their eyes closed. The glass dissipates and the female figure's hand shows up center-screen. It also shows her sitting down in a meditative position. Later on, she is seen dancing in a pink floating temple, more female figures appear again. The temple begins to gyrate on its axis, and the floor the figure is dancing on breaks into squares for a brief moment. More female figures are seen dancing. As the video ends, a distorted but patterned picture appears and the song's title and artist show up.

Track listing
Digital download
 "Go Bang" – 3:09

Digital download (remixes)
 "Go Bang" – 3:09
 "Go Bang"  – 4:42
 "Go Bang"  – 6:02
 "Go Bang"  – 5:53
 "Go Bang"  – 4:22

Charts

Weekly charts

Year-end charts

Certifications

Release history

References

2017 songs
2017 singles
Pnau songs
Songs written by Nick Littlemore
Songs written by Peter Mayes
Songs written by Sam Littlemore
Songs written by Luke Steele (musician)
ARIA Award-winning songs